Goodrick is a surname. Notable people with the surname include:

Alan Goodrick (Gimpo), British film director
Garney Goodrick (1895–1929), Australian sportsman who played first-class cricket for Tasmania and Australian rules football in the Victorian Football League
Mick Goodrick (born 1945), American post bop jazz guitarist and educator most noteworthy for his work with vibraphonist Gary Burton's band
Nicholas Goodrick-Clarke B.A. (Bristol), D.Phil., a professor of Western esotericism at University of Exeter and author of several books on esoteric traditions

See also
Black Sun (Goodrick-Clarke book), book by Nicholas Goodrick-Clarke